Nikola Spanić (Latinized as Nicolaus Spanich, 1633–1707) was a Roman Catholic prelate and nobleman of Korčula (an island in modern Croatia). A descendant of the Albanian Spani family of Drivasto, he served as the island's bishop from 1673 to 1707. After an earthquake in 1667 he restored a church dedicated to St. Anthony near the main town of the island.

Sources 

1633 births
1707 deaths
17th-century Croatian people
18th-century Croatian people
Roman Catholic bishops in Croatia
Republic of Venice clergy
People from Korčula
Nikola
Venetian period in the history of Croatia
Croatian people of Greek descent